Prolimnocyon ("before Limnocyon") is an extinct paraphyletic genus of limnocyonid hyaenodonts that lived in Asia and North America during the late Paleocene to middle Eocene. Prolimnocyon chowi is the earliest known member of the hyaenodontid family Limnocyonidae.

Phylogeny
The phylogenetic relationships of genus Prolimnocyon are shown in the following cladogram.

See also
 Mammal classification
 Limnocyonidae

References

Hyaenodonts
Eocene mammals
Paleocene mammals
Paleogene mammals of North America
Paleogene mammals of Asia
Paleocene first appearances
Prehistoric placental genera